Minced meat may refer to:
 Ground meat, meat that has been minced or ground
 Ground beef, a ground meat made of beef

Minced meat may be confused with:
 Mincemeat, a mixture of dried fruit and spices, commonly does not contain any meat
 Operation Mincemeat, a British deception operation of the Second World War
 Mint sauce,  sauce made from finely chopped mint leaves, soaked in vinegar, and a small amount of sugar
 Mince pie

See also 
 Mince (disambiguation)
 Keema